Friedrich Middelhauve (17 November 1896 in Siegen, Westphalia – 14 July 1966 in Bad Mergentheim, Baden-Württemberg) was a German publisher and politician of the Free Democratic Party (FDP). From 1947 until 1956 he served as State chairman for North Rhine-Westphalia and from 27 July 1954 until 1956, he was Deputy Prime Minister and Minister of Economy and Transport in North Rhine-Westphalia.

Early life and publishing career
In 1921 he obtained a Doctorate at the University of Cologne in engineering. However he first became an independent bookseller in Leverkusen and opted for a career as a publisher in 1922.

Middelhauve was the founder and owner of the Opladen company in 1922 who first published the works of Heinrich Böll. Westdeutschen Verlag which Middelhauve also founded became one of the leading social science publishers in Germany.

He was married to Bertha Middelhauve and had three children: Dr. Friedrich Middelhauve, Jr., Gertraud Middelhauve (who also became a publisher) and Mechthild Ruf.

Political activity
During the Weimar Republic, Middelhauve was in the  member of German State Party. During the Nazism era he was not politically active.

In 1945 he became affiliated with the FDP and an associate of  Franz Blücher, Hermann Hopker-Aschoff and Erich Mende, notable leadership figures in the Rhineland. In 1946/47 he was a city councilor in Leverkusen. From 1947 until 1956 he worked as a successor to Gustav Altenhain as State chairman for North Rhine-Westphalia. From 1952 to 1956 he served as the Deputy and from 27 July 1954 until 1956 was Deputy Prime Minister and Minister of Economy and Transport in North Rhine-Westphalia. From 1946 to 1958 he was a member of the diet of North Rhine-Westphalia and from 1949 until 17 October 1950 and 1953 until 10 September 1954, Middelhauve also belonged to the national Bundestag.

Middelhauve had close contact with ex-Nazi Ernst Achenbach and with several former Nazis he designed the "German program", with the state associations of Hamburg, Bremen and Baden-Württemberg in the early 1950s.

After the coup of the so-called  "Young Turks", involving Wolfgang Döring, Erich Mende, Walter Scheel, Willi Weyer and Hans Wolfgang Rubin in 1956, the Christian Democratic Union of Germany Prime Minister Karl Arnold with a constructive vote of no confidence, and Socialist Party of Germany politician Fritz Steinhoff found Middelhauve guilty of acting as a "mentor" for the group and he was demoted from his position in the government of North Rhine-Westphalia, two years before his term was due to finish. He did however remain a party member of the FDP until his death in 1966.

He died in Bad Mergentheim on 14 July 1966 and was buried at the Birch Mountain Cemetery.

References

Literature
Karl Hax, Friedrich Middelhauve zum Gedächtnis in ZfbF 1966, S. 613-615

External links
Leverkusen page

1896 births
1966 deaths
People from Siegen
People from the Province of Westphalia
German Democratic Party politicians
Members of the Bundestag for North Rhine-Westphalia
German publishers (people)
University of Cologne alumni
Members of the Landtag of North Rhine-Westphalia
Members of the Bundestag for the Free Democratic Party (Germany)